The Darrieus–Landau instability or hydrodynamic instability is an instrinsic flame instability that occurs in premixed flames, caused by the density variation due to the thermal expansion of the gas produced by the combustion process. In simple terms, the stability inquires whether a steadily propagating plane sheet with a discontinuous jump in density is stable or not. It was predicted independently by Georges Jean Marie Darrieus and Lev Landau.

The instability analysis behind the Darrieus–Landau instability considers a planar, premixed flame front subjected to very small perturbations. It is useful to think of this arrangement as one in which the unperturbed flame is stationary, with the reactants (fuel and oxidizer) directed towards the flame and perpendicular to it with a velocity u1, and the burnt gases leaving the flame also in a perpendicular way but with velocity u2. The analysis assumes that the flow is an incompressible flow, and that the perturbations are governed by the linearized Euler equations and, thus, are inviscid.  With these considerations, the main result of this analysis is that, if the density of the burnt gases is less than that of the reactants, which is the case in practice due to the thermal expansion of the gas produced by the combustion process, the flame front is unstable to perturbations of any wavelength. Another result is that the rate of growth of the perturbations is inversely proportional to their wavelength; thus small flame wrinkles (but larger than the characteristic flame thickness) grow faster than larger ones.  In practice, however, diffusive and buoyancy effects that are not taken into account by the analysis of Darrieus and Landau may have a stabilizing effect.

Dispersion relation

In combustion  always and therefore the growth rate  for all wavenumbers. This implies that a plane sheet of flame with a burning velocity  is unstable for all wavenumbers. In fact, Amable Liñán and Forman A. Williams quote in their book that in view of laboratory observations of stable, planar, laminar flames, publication of their theoretical predictions required courage on the part of Darrieus and Landau.

If the buoyancy forces are taken into account (in others words, accounts of Rayleigh–Taylor instability are considered) for planar flames that are perpendicular to the gravity vector, then some level of stability can be anticipated for flames propagating vertically downwards (or flames that held stationary by a vertically upward flow) since in these cases, the denser unburnt gas lies beneath the lighter burnt gas mixture. Of course, flames that are propagating vertically upwards or those that are held stationary by a vertically downward flow, both the Darrieus–Landau mechanism and the Rayleigh–Taylor mechanism contributes to the destabilizing effect. The dispersion relation when buoyance forces are included becomes

where  corresponds to gravitational acceleration for flames propagating downwards and  corresponds to gravitational acceleration for flames propagating upwards. The above dispersion implies that gravity introduces stability for downward propagating flames when , where  is a characteristic buoyancy length scale.

Darrieus and Landau's analysis treats the flame as a plane sheet to investigate its stability with the neglect of diffusion effects, whereas in reality, the flame has a definite thickness, say the laminar flame thickness , where  is the thermal diffusivity, wherein diffusion effects cannot be neglected. Accounting for the flame structure, are found to stabilize the flames for small wavelengths , except when fuel diffusion coefficient and thermal diffusivity differ from each other significantly leading to the diffusive-thermal instability. 

References

Fluid dynamics
Combustion
Fluid dynamic instabilities
Lev Landau